= Sheriguda =

- Village /city
- Location in Telangana, India Sheriguda (India)
- Coordinates: 17.2095462°N 78.6186294°E
- Country: India
- State: Telangana

Languages
  - Official: Telugu
- Time zone: UTC+5:30 (IST)
- Pincode: 501510
- Vehicle registration: TS
- Website: telangana.gov.in

Sheriguda is a village in the Indian state of Telangana. It is in the Rangareddy district.

Sheriguda is one of the village in Ibrahimpatnam mandal of Rangareddy Dist. PIN Code N. 501510. This Village is located at 21 km Away from MGBS bus Stand in the Nagarjuna Sagar Highway. Basic occupation in Sheriguda village is Agriculture. Agriculture here is mainly depends upon the lake which is called as Ibrahimpatnam lake (Pedda Cheruvu). But due to the water scarcity in the lake, now people are mostly depending upon the borewells for the Agriculture. Being Outskirt village of Hyderabad, Real Estate business is also in full swing around this area. Sheriguda is place for Educational Institutions. Many Poultry farms surrounding areas. There are many Engineering, MCA, MBA, B.ED and Pharmacy Colleges in the villages. Some of them are Sri Indu College of Engineering, Sree Datta Institute of Science, Sree Dattha Group of institutions and Technology, Sri Chakra college for MCA, Sree Datta Institute of Pharmacy and Sri Chaitanya College of Engginering and Technology.
